The Los Angeles Fighter Wing was a unit of the United States Army Air Forces.  The wing provided air defense of southern California and trained fighter units and pilots.  It was stationed at Los Angeles, California, where it was disbanded on 7 June 1944.

History
To carry out this mission, Fourth Air Force organized regional air defense wings in August 1942. The Los Angeles Air Defense Wing was organized to provide air defense for the Los Angeles area and train fighter groups and pilots.  

The Army Air Forces later found that standard military units like the wing, whose manning was based on relatively inflexible tables of organization were not well adapted to the training mission, even more so to the replacement mission.  Accordingly, the Army Air Forces adopted a more functional system in which each base was organized into a separate numbered unit, with similar flexible units established for headquarters.

In this reorganization, the wing's headquarters squadron was replaced by the 410th AAF Base Unit (Fighter Wing) on 1 April 1944.  The wing itself was disbanded on 7 July 1944, and the 410th was redescribed as the 410th AAF Base Unit (Air Defense Region).  In 1946, it became the 410th AAF Base Unit (Los Angeles Control Group), and was discontinued on 1 January 1947.

Lineage
 Constituted as the Los Angeles Air Defense Wing on 6 August 1942
 Activated on 11 August 1942
 Redesignated Los Angeles Fighter Wing c. 2 July 1943
 Disbanded 7 June 1944

Assignments
 IV Fighter Command, 11 August 1942
 Fourth Air Force, 31 March – 7 June 1944

Components

 20th Fighter Group: 1 January – 11 August 1943
 329th Fighter Group, 12 April 1943 – 1 March 1944
 360th Fighter Group: 15 January 1943 – 31 March 1944
 364th Fighter Group: 11 October 1943 – 11 January 1944
 412th Fighter Group: 30 November 1943 – 11 October 1944
 473d Fighter Group: 1 November 1943 – 31 March 1944
 474th Fighter Group: 11 October 1943 – 6 February 1944
 479th Fighter Group, 1 November 1943 – 15 May 1944

Station
 Los Angeles, California, 11 August 1942 – 7 June 1944

References

Notes
 Explanatory notes

 Citations

Bibliography

 
 
 
 
 

Fighter wings of the United States Army Air Forces
Military units and formations disestablished in 1944
California in World War II
History of Los Angeles